The 1996 Intercontinental Cup was an association football match played on 26 November 1996, between Juventus, winners of the 1995–96 UEFA Champions League, and River Plate, winners of the 1996 Copa Libertadores. The match was played at the National Stadium in Tokyo. It was Juventus' third appearance into the competition, after the defeat in 1973 and the victory in 1985 against Argentinos Juniors, whereas it was River Plate's second appearance after the victory in 1986 against Steaua București.

Alessandro Del Piero was named as man of the match and got the only goal of the game when he shot right footed to the top of the net in the 81st minute.

Venue

Match details

Match Ball
The Ball of the match was the Adidas Questra, originally designed to be the official match ball of the 1994 FIFA World Cup in the United States.

See also
1995–96 UEFA Champions League
1996 Copa Libertadores
Juventus F.C. in European football

References

i
i
Intercontinental Cup
Intercontinental Cup (football)
i
i
Intercontinental Cup (football) matches hosted by Japan
Sports competitions in Tokyo
November 1996 sports events in Asia
1996 in Tokyo
1996 in association football